Stefano Colantuono (born 23 October 1962 in Rome) is an Italian football professional football manager and former player, who played as a defender, currently in charge as youth system chief of Salernitana.

Playing career
Colantuono, a centre back, started his playing career for Serie D side Velletri in 1981. In 1983, he moved to Ternana of Serie C1, then Arezzo of Serie B, and finally made his Serie A debut for Pisa. He played Serie A until 1990 for several teams. In 1991, he accepted to play in the national futsal league for BNL Roma, winning a scudetto. Following this experience, Colantuono played mostly at lower levels, especially Serie C2 and Serie D, and even Eccellenza for Sambenedettese in 1994–95. After a long list of experiences in different Italian regions, Colantuono returned to play for Sambenedettese in November 2000, leading his team to an immediate promotion to Serie C2.

Managerial career
The 2001–02 Serie C2 season for Sambenedettese was going to be very hard, with two coaches fired throughout the season. After the sack of third coach Enrico Nicolini, Colantuono, a player for the team, was appointed to manage Sambenedettese together with Gabriele Matricciani for the last nine matches. Surprisingly, Colantuono managed to win all these nine matches, leading his team to a fifth place, qualifying and successively even winning the promotion playoffs.

Colantuono's Serie C1 coaching debut, in 2002–03, ended in another fifth place, securing a place in the promotion playoff, then lost to Pescara. In the meanwhile, Luciano Gaucci, owner of Sambenedettese, Serie B team Catania and Serie A team Perugia at the time, appointed Colantuono at the helm of the Sicilian side. Colantuono, again supported by Matricciani because of his lack of a regular coaching license, led Catania to a fairly good season in ninth place. In 2004–05, after Catania was sold by the Gaucci family, Colantuono, finally authorized to act as first team coach, signed for Perugia, just relegated to Serie B. He led the team to a spot in the promotion playoff, then lost to Torino. After the cancellation of Perugia, in 2005–06 Colantuono accepted the offer of Atalanta, leading the nerazzurri to a clear Serie B win. In the 2006–07 season, he led Atalanta to an eighth-place finish in the Serie A table.

On 31 May 2007, he was announced as new Palermo head coach to replace Francesco Guidolin. However, after a number of unimpressive performances ended by a crushing 5–0 loss to Juventus persuaded club chairman Maurizio Zamparini to sack him on 26 November 2007. He was once again recalled on 24 March 2008 to replace Guidolin as head coach of Palermo. However, Colantuono was sacked again after just one game of the 2008–09 season, and was replaced by Davide Ballardini on 4 September.

On 15 June 2009, he was appointed as new head coach of Torino, replacing Giancarlo Camolese. He guided the granata through their 2009–10 Serie B campaign, with the aim to promptly lead the historical Turin club back into the top flight. He was however fired on 29 November due to poor results and replaced by Mario Beretta. On 10 January 2010 he was then reappointed as head coach to replace Beretta himself. He announced his resignation after losing the promotion playoff finals to Brescia, contemporaneously confirming he was in talks for the vacant coaching post at his previous club Atalanta. Colantuono's comeback at Atalanta was officially announced the next day. Under his tenure, Atalanta promptly won the "Cadetti" and promotion back to Serie A in his first season in charge during the 2010–11 Serie B season.

Colantuono led Atalanta's successful return to the top flight during the 2011–12 Serie A season, resulting in a comfortable 12th-place finish, despite the club beginning the season with a six-point deduction for its involvement in the 2011–12 Italian football scandal. An additional deduction of 2 points followed before the 2012–13 Serie A season; however, Colantuono still managed to guide Atalanta to safety with a 15th-place finish. Keeping with their manager for the 2013–14 Serie A campaign, Coulantuono secured 11th place and some impressive performances, including victories of local rivals Internazionale and A.C. Milan. Before the start of the 2014–15 Serie A season, Coulantuono committed his future to Atalanta, however, the season did not go well and after a poor run of form he was dismissed on 4 March 2015 and replaced by Edy Reja, leaving Atalanta only 3 points above the relegation zone. He took up the head coach position soon after at Udinese.

He then guided Bari from November 2016 until June 2017, only achieving twelfth place with one of the clubs that was more widely expected to fight for a promotion spot. He was subsequently appointed head coach of Salernitana in December 2017, taking over from Alberto Bollini, guiding the club to a mid-table finish.

After being confirmed in charge of Salernitana for the 2018–19 season, Colantuono resigned on 18 December 2018 after three consecutive defeats which left the promotion hopefuls in a mid-table position in the league table.

In September 2020 he accepted a non-coaching managerial role at his former club Sambenedettese, being appointed as technical director. He was removed from his role on 11 January 2021.

On 17 October 2021, he was appointed new head coach of his former team Salernitana, replacing Fabrizio Castori and taking over with the club being at the bottom of the 2021–22 Serie A table. He was removed from his managerial duties on 15 February 2022, a few weeks after a club takeover, after failing to improve the club's fortunes. On 8 August 2022, he was re-hired by Salernitana as the club's new youth system chief.

Managerial statistics

Honours

Manager

Atalanta
Serie B: 2005–06, 2010–11

References

1962 births
Living people
Footballers from Rome
Italian footballers
Italian football managers
Ternana Calcio players
S.S. Arezzo players
Pisa S.C. players
U.S. Avellino 1912 players
Como 1907 players
Ascoli Calcio 1898 F.C. players
Frosinone Calcio players
A.S. Sambenedettese players
Fermana F.C. players
Serie A players
Serie B players
Serie C players
Serie D players
Palermo F.C. managers
Atalanta B.C. managers
A.C. Perugia Calcio managers
Catania S.S.D. managers
Torino F.C. managers
Udinese Calcio managers
Serie A managers
Association football defenders
F.S. Sestrese Calcio 1919 players
S.S. Maceratese 1922 players